The B-Side Collection is a compilation album by pop rock band Maroon 5, released on December 18, 2007. The album is a compilation of seven songs that were originally only released on single B-sides, or as international or store bought bonuses on the album, all six of which are included, plus the “If I Never See Your Face Again” remix featuring Rihanna. The album peaked at number 51 in the U.S. Billboard 200 in its first week of release.

Background

Production
Maroon 5 recorded over a dozen songs for their second studio album It Won't Be Soon Before Long. After finalizing the final track listing of the album, many songs were left out, including favorites of lead singer Adam Levine. While promoting the album in the United States and Mexico the group decided to release seven of the unreleased tracks to the public.
Label A&M/Octone spoke with Levine about releasing a deluxe version of It Won't Be Soon Before Long since sales were positive at that time. The studio had many meetings with iTunes and by the final week of November they decided to release seven tracks cut from It Won't Be Soon Before Long.

Release and promotion
The album was heavily promoted on the iTunes Store and official Apple website. The entire album was streamed on Apple Inc.'s website, beginning on December 12, 2007, a week before the album's North American release date.

After the main promotion for It Won't Be Soon Before Long and its singles, Maroon 5 released a music video for the track "Story" in 2009. The video was directed by Bob Carmichael and was mainly released to raise awareness for the Harlem Children's Zone. The music video is mainly an animated slideshow of Maroon 5 during the It Won't Be Soon Before Long Tour and its various stops. The video won for the 31st annual of People's Telly Awards in 2010.

Album performance
This is the second album released exclusively on iTunes by Maroon 5, the first one was the Limited Set (iTunes Exclusive) which was removed from the iTunes Store in early 2004. The B-Side Collection has been well received by both critics and fans, the album peaked at number 51 at the Billboard 200 and is a huge success on the iTunes Stores, on its first day of release the album went from number 96 to 6 on the American iTunes Store, and at the Canadian store it went from 56 to 19.

Track listing

Charts

Personnel
 Adam Levine – vocals, guitar
 Jesse Carmichael – keyboards, backing vocals
 James Valentine – lead guitar, backing vocals
 Mickey Madden – bass guitar
 Matt Flynn – drums, percussion

References

Maroon 5 compilation albums
ITunes-exclusive releases
2007 compilation albums
B-side compilation albums
Albums produced by Mike Elizondo
Maroon 5 EPs
A&M Octone Records EPs
2007 EPs
A&M Octone Records compilation albums
Albums produced by Sam Farrar
Albums produced by Mark Endert